The Robinson River is a river in the Kimberley region of Western Australia.

There are six tributaries to the Robinson River, including Keightly River, Mondooma Creek, Pardaboora River, Tarraji River and Townshend River.

References

Rivers of the Kimberley region of Western Australia